Alfredo Jocelyn-Holt Letelier is a Chilean writer and historian who gained notoriety by his study of the Chilean elite aristocracy and plutocracy and his criticism of traditional state-centered historiography. Jocelyn-Holt has also written several controversial columns, among them one in The Clinic in 2005 where he harshly criticized then presidential candidate Michelle Bachelet.

He has two brothers: Enrique, an economist; and Tomás, lawyer and politician, former member of the Christian Democratic Party of Chile and ex-candidate for the 2013 election of Chile.

References

University of Chile alumni
Alumni of St Antony's College, Oxford
20th-century Chilean historians
20th-century Chilean male writers
21st-century Chilean historians
21st-century Chilean male writers
People from Santiago
1955 births
Living people
Westland Middle School alumni
Bethesda-Chevy Chase High School alumni
Johns Hopkins University alumni
Pontifical Catholic University of Chile alumni 
Academic staff of the University of Talca
Academic staff of the University of Santiago, Chile
Academic staff of Diego Portales University
Academic staff of the University of Chile
Academic staff of the Pontifical Catholic University of Chile
Academic staff of the Andrés Bello National University